Halfmoon Lake is the name of a lake in the Ocala National Forest, Florida. Half Moon is a spring fed fresh water lake and part of an area known as Land of Lakes with over 600 lakes and ponds in the Central Florida area.

Half Moon Lake covers roughly 500 acres (2 km2) and is situated in the Ocala Wildlife Management Area in a protected Federal Forest.

References

External links
Ocala National Forest
Half Moon Lake Ocklawaha Photos

Lakes of Florida
Protected areas of Marion County, Florida
Ocala National Forest
Lakes of Marion County, Florida